Her Smoke Rose Up Forever is a collection of science fiction and fantasy stories by author James Tiptree, Jr. It was released in 1990 by Arkham House. It was originally published in an edition of 4,108 copies and was the author's second book published by Arkham House. It was later released to a wider audience in paperback form in 2004 from Tachyon Publications.

Contents
Her Smoke Rose Up Forever contains the following stories:

 "Introduction" by John Clute
 The Green Hills of Earth
 "The Last Flight of Dr. Ain" (1969)
 "The Screwfly Solution" (1977)
 The Boundaries of Humanity
 "And I Awoke and Found Me Here on the Cold Hill's Side" (1972)
 "The Girl Who Was Plugged In" (1973)
 "The Man Who Walked Home" (1972)
 "And I Have Come Upon This Place By Lost Ways" (1972)
 Male and Female
 "The Women Men Don't See" (1973)
 "Your Faces, O My Sisters! Your Faces Filled of Light!" (1976)
 "Houston, Houston, Do You Read?" (1976)
 Star Songs
 "With Delicate Mad Hands" (1981)
 "A Momentary Taste of Being" (1975)
 "We Who Stole the Dream" (1978)
 Life and Death
 "Her Smoke Rose Up Forever" (1974)
 "Love Is the Plan the Plan Is Death" (1973)
 "On the Last Afternoon" (1972)
 "She Waits for All Men Born" (1976)
 "Slow Music" (1980)
 Epilogue: And Man Abides...
 "And So On, and So On" (1971)

References

Sources

1990 short story collections
Short story collections by James Tiptree Jr.
Fantasy short story collections
Science fiction short story collections
Arkham House books